Mouilly is a commune in the Meuse department in Grand Est in north-eastern France.

See also 
 Communes of the Meuse department
Parc naturel régional de Lorraine

References

Communes of Meuse (department)